Rilhac-Treignac is a commune in the Corrèze department in the Nouvelle-Aquitaine region in central France.

The closest neighboring communes are Chamberet (8 km), Treignac (12 km), and Uzerche (18 km).

Population

See also
Communes of the Corrèze department

References

Communes of Corrèze
Corrèze communes articles needing translation from French Wikipedia